Dharavi Bank is an Indian crime drama streaming television series by director Samit Kakkad and actors Suniel Shetty, Vivek Oberoi, Sonali Kulkarni and Samikssha Batnagar. The series is Suniel Shetty's OTT debut.

Cast 
Cast list credited from original show
 Suniel Shetty as Thalaivan
 Vivek Oberoi as Jayant Gavaskar 
 Anngad Raaj as Vinayak (Veenu), JCP Jayant Gavaskar and Irawati's son
 Sonali Kulkarni as Janvi Surve
 Siddharth Menon as Veerbhadra
 Shantipriya as Bonamma 
 Freddy Daruwala as Mahesh
 Luke Kenny as Michael
 Bhavana Rao as Lawyer
 Nagesh Bhosle as Ghanshyam Mahtre 
 Hitesh Bhojraj as undercover police sharpshooter
 Rohit Pathak as Rajan, Thalaivan's son-in-law
 Jaywant Wadkar as Franchis
 Chinmay Mandlekar as Daji Malusare

Plot 
The series narrates the rise of Thalaivan (Sunil Shetty) as the most influential person of Dharavi as well as the Godman of many politicians. For political benefit the Chief Minister Janvi Surve (Sonali Kulkarni) calls JCP Jayant Gavaskar (Vivek Oberoi) and orders to kill Thalaivan. Gavaskar takes the order both personal (as Thalaivan killed his child) vengeance and professional assignment. The conflict between Gavaskar's Mumbai police and Thalaivan's gang starts, but some political turns save Thalaivan.

Filming 
The series has been shot in the constricted lanes of Dharavi, India’s largest slum.

Release 
Dharavi Bank Session 1 streaming started on MX Player from November 19, 2022.

Episodes

Reception 
Dharavi Bank Season 1 received both positive and negative reviews. Saibal Chatterjee for NDTV gave 2/5 stars and wrote "Dharavi Bank sorely lacks the sort of narrative reserves that can fuel a compelling thriller." Abhimanyu Mathur for Hindustan Times wrote "Dharavi Bank will appeal to some, the ones who like the old-fashioned gangster dramas with over-the-top action. But the show is too old-fashioned and not in a classic way." Archika Khurana for The Times of India gave 3/5 rating and wrote "Suniel Shetty outshines everyone in his OTT debut as the brutal and vivacious gang lord of Dharavi. Right from his serious gaze to the protectiveness of his family and his wearing of the crisp white Mundu, Anna proves to be a perfect fit for the role of Thalavian."

Manik Sharma for Firstpost wrote "The plotline, as a whole, moves with the steady but ultimately predictable pace of a Gangster v Police war where betrayals, rats and spies abound." Shipra Darmwal of LeisureByte concurred, stating that the "twists are predictable" and furthermore the series "does not offer anything new".

References

External links 

Indian drama web series
2022 web series debuts
Hindi-language web series
MX Player original programming